Asia-Pacific Institute of Creativity (APIC) was an educational college located in Toufen City, Miaoli County, Taiwan.

APIC offers a variety of undergraduate and graduate programs in creative fields. These include Bachelor's degrees in Visual Communication Design, Fashion Design, Digital Media Design, and 3D Animation, as well as Master's degrees in Design Strategy and Innovation, and Digital Entertainment and Game Design.

History
The school was originally founded as Chin-Min College in 1985. In 1992, it was renamed to Chin-Min Institute of Technology. Finally in 2010, the school was named as Asia-Pacific Institute of Creativity.

By end of 2016, the school submitted a proposal to the Ministry of Education to revamp the school system but was rejected. In March 2017, the ministry requested the school to submit a proposal on how they shall improve the school curriculum, academic staffs quality and increase the number of student intakes by 28 April 2017. The school was eventually closed down in 2019.

Faculties
 Division of Creative Design
 Division of Digital Entertainment
 Division of Fashion and Life technology
 Division of Tourism and Hospitality

Notable alumni
 Hsu Yao-chang, Magistrate of Miaoli County

See also
 List of universities in Taiwan

References

1985 establishments in Taiwan
2019 disestablishments in Taiwan
Educational institutions established in 1985
Educational institutions disestablished in 2019
Defunct universities and colleges in Taiwan